Punahyrax is an extinct genus of placental mammal belonging to the family Archaeohyracidae, within the order Notoungulata, and endemic of South America.
Its fossilized remains were discovered in Argentina, and were found in the Geste Formation, near Antofagasta de la Sierra in the Catamarca Province, and in the Pozuelos Formation in the Salta Province. Those sites are considered to represent a fauna dated from the Mustersan, the South American Late Eocene.

Etymology

The name Punahyrax is composed of the prefix Puna-, the Quechua word designing the central altiplano of the Andes, and who gave its name to the puna grassland ecoregion, and of the suffix -hyrax, commonly used in the taxonomy of Archaeohyracidae. The species name, Punahyrax bondesioi, honors the paleontologist Pedro Bondesio.

Description

Punahyrax was one of the smaller archaeohyracids, approximately 30% smaller than Archaeohyrax. Apart from its size, it was distinguished from its relatives by the absence of the anterolingual cingulum in the upper molars and of the trigonid fossa in the lower molars.

Holotype

The holotype MLP 88-V-10-6 is a fragmentary mandible preserving the second molar, kept in the La Plata Museum, in Argentina.

References

Typotheres
Eocene mammals of South America
Paleogene Argentina
Fossils of Argentina
Fossil taxa described in 2008
Prehistoric placental genera